OŠK Rudňany is a Slovak football team, based in the town of Rudňany.

Current squad

Colours
Club colours are black, green and yellow.

External links
Soccerway profile 
  
Club profile at Futbalnet.sk

References

Football clubs in Slovakia
Association football clubs established in 1932